Grevillea squiresiae is a species of flowering plant in the family Proteaceae and is endemic to a small area in the Avon Wheatbelt region of Western Australia. It is a single-stemmed shrub, usually with pinnatipartite leaves, the end lobes more or less linear, and clusters of red flowers.

Description
Both surfaces of the leaves are more or less glabrous and leathery.

Taxonomy and namingGrevillea squiresiae was first formally described in 2002 by Peter M. Olde and Neil R. Marriott in the journal Nuytsia from specimens they collected east of Mukinbudin in 1999. The species was discovered by Mary Squire, a farmer and conservationist for whom it is named. The specific epithet is correctly spelled squiresiae not squiresae as the name appeared in the original publication, are honours the discoverer of the species.

Distribution and habitat
This grevillea has a limited range, growing on hills, slopes and road verges near Mukinbudin in the Avon Wheatbelt bioregion of south-western Western Australia.

Conservation statusGrevillea squiresiae'' is listed as "Priority One" by the Government of Western Australia Department of Biodiversity, Conservation and Attractions, meaning that it is known from only one or a few locations that are potentially at risk.

See also
 List of Grevillea species

References

squiresiae
Proteales of Australia
Eudicots of Western Australia
Plants described in 2002